Bill Cracks Down is a 1937 American action romantic drama film directed by William Nigh. The film is also known as Men of Steel in the United Kingdom.

Plot
Bill Reardon runs a steel mill and is the idol of his workers; he'll forego his board meetings to challenge his workers in coal shoveling contests. His heart eventually gives out, but prior to his death he makes his will out with some unusual provisos. His playboy artist son Bill Junior returns from Paris to discover that in order to receive his inheritance he must work in the steel mill for one year with a false name, with the foreman "Tons" Walker being in charge of the mill. "Tons" decides to build Junior's character by changing him from an office file clerk to a hard working coal shoveling steel man. Junior plans his revenge by seducing "Tons"' fiancee.

Tagline
Men of Steel Meet Iron-Willed Women

Cast 
Grant Withers as "Tons" Walker
Beatrice Roberts as Susan Bailey
Ranny Weeks as Bill Reardon Jr., aka Bill Hall
Judith Allen as Elaine Witworth
William Newell as Eddie "Porky" Plunkett
Pierre Watkin as William "Bill" Reardon Sr.
Roger Williams as Steve, Mill Foreman
Georgia Caine as Mrs. Witworth
Greta Meyer as Hilda
Edgar Norton as Jarvis, the Butler
Harry Depp as Smalley, the Lawyer
Eugene King as Zimich
Landers Stevens as Dr. Colcord
Eddie 'Rochester' Anderson as Chauffeur
Jean Carmen as Girl (uncredited)
Rolfe Sedan as Jewelry Salesman (uncredited)
Tom Steele as Mill Worker at Party (uncredited)

Notes

External links 

1937 films
1937 romantic drama films
Republic Pictures films
American black-and-white films
American romantic drama films
American action drama films
1930s action drama films
Films set in factories
1930s English-language films
Films directed by William Nigh
1930s American films